Dylan Girdlestone (born 11 October 1989) is a South African professional racing cyclist.

References

External links

1989 births
Living people
South African male cyclists
Sportspeople from East London, Eastern Cape